A swamp is a forested wetland. Swamps are considered to be transition zones because both land and water play a role in creating this environment. Swamps vary in size and are located all around the world. The water of a swamp may be fresh water, brackish water, or seawater. Freshwater swamps form along large rivers or lakes where they are critically dependent upon rainwater and seasonal flooding to maintain natural water level fluctuations. Saltwater swamps are found along tropical and subtropical coastlines. Some swamps have hammocks, or dry-land protrusions, covered by aquatic vegetation, or vegetation that tolerates periodic inundation or soil saturation. The two main types of swamp are "true" or swamp forests and "transitional" or shrub swamps. In the boreal regions of Canada, the word swamp is colloquially used for what is more formally termed a bog, fen, or muskeg. Some of the world's largest swamps are found along major rivers such as the Amazon, the Mississippi, and the Congo.

Differences between marshes and swamps

Swamps and marshes are specific types of wetlands that form along waterbodies containing rich, hydric soils. Marshes are wetlands, continually or frequently flooded by nearby running bodies of water, that are dominated by emergent soft-stem vegetation and herbaceous plants. Swamps are wetlands consisting of saturated soils or standing water and are dominated by water-tolerant woody vegetation such as shrubs, bushes, and trees.

Hydrology

Swamps are characterized by their saturated soils and slow-moving waters. The water that accumulates in swamps comes from a variety of sources including precipitation, groundwater, tides and/or freshwater flooding. These hydrologic pathways all contribute to how energy and nutrients flow in and out of the ecosystem. As water flows through the swamp, nutrients, sediment and pollutants are naturally filtered out. Chemicals like phosphorus and nitrogen that end up in waterways get absorbed and used by the aquatic plants within the swamp, purifying the water. Any remaining or excess chemicals present will accumulate at the bottom of the swamp, being removed from the water and buried within the sediment. The biogeochemical environment of a swamp is dependent on its hydrology, affecting the levels and availability of resources like oxygen, nutrients, water pH and toxicity, which will influence the whole ecosystem.

Values and ecosystem services

Swamps and other wetlands have traditionally held a very low property value compared to fields, prairies, or woodlands. They have a reputation for being unproductive land that cannot easily be utilized for human activities, other than hunting, trapping, or fishing. Farmers, for example, typically drained swamps next to their fields so as to gain more land usable for planting crops, both historically, and to a lesser extent, presently. On the other hand, swamps can (and do) play a beneficial ecological role in the overall functions of the natural environment and provide a variety of resources that many species depend on. Swamps and other wetlands have shown to be a natural form of flood management and defense against flooding. In such circumstances where flooding does occur, swamps absorb and use the excess water within the wetland, preventing it from traveling and flooding surrounding areas. Dense vegetation within the swamp also provides soil stability to the land, holding soils and sediment in place whilst preventing erosion and land loss. Swamps are an abundant and valuable source of fresh water and oxygen for all life, and they are often breeding grounds for a wide variety of species. Floodplain swamps are an important resource in the production and distribution of fish. Two thirds of global fish and shellfish are commercially harvested and dependent on wetlands.

Impacts and conservation

Historically, humans have been known to drain and/or fill swamps and other wetlands in order to create more space for human development and to reduce the threat of diseases borne by swamp insects. Wetlands are removed and replaced with land that is then used for things like agriculture, real estate, and recreational uses. Many swamps have also undergone intensive logging and farming, requiring the construction of drainage ditches and canals. These ditches and canals contributed to drainage and, along the coast, allowed salt water to intrude, converting swamps to marsh or even to open water.  Large areas of swamp were therefore lost or degraded. Louisiana provides a classic example of wetland loss from these combined factors. Europe has probably lost nearly half its wetlands. New Zealand lost 90 percent of its wetlands over a period of 150 years. Ecologists recognize that swamps provide  ecological services including flood control, fish production, water purification, carbon storage, and wildlife habitats. In many parts of the world authorities protect swamps. In parts of Europe and North America, swamp restoration projects are becoming widespread. The United States government began enforcing stricter laws and management programs in the 1970s in efforts to protect and restore these ecosystems. Often the simplest steps to restoring swamps involve plugging drainage ditches and removing levees.

Conservationists work to preserve swamps such as those in northwest Indiana in the United States Midwest that were preserved as part of the Indiana Dunes.

Notable examples
Swamps can be found on all continents except Antarctica.

The largest swamp in the world is the Amazon River floodplain, which is particularly significant for its large number of fish and tree species.

Africa
The Sudd and the Okavango Delta are Africa's best known marshland areas. The Bangweulu Floodplains make up Africa's largest swamp.

Asia

The Mesopotamian Marshes is a large swamp and river system in southern Iraq, traditionally inhabited in part by the Marsh Arabs.

In Asia, tropical peat swamps are located in mainland East Asia and Southeast Asia. In Southeast Asia, peatlands are mainly found in low altitude coastal and sub-coastal areas and extend inland for distance more than  along river valleys and across watersheds. They are mostly to be found on the coasts of East Sumatra, Kalimantan (Central, East, South and West Kalimantan provinces), West Papua, Papua New Guinea, Brunei, Peninsular Malaya, Sabah, Sarawak, Southeast Thailand, and the Philippines (Riley et al.,1996). Indonesia has the largest area of tropical peatland.

The Vasyugan Swamp is a large swamp in the western Siberia area of the Russian Federation. This is one of the largest swamps in the world, covering an area larger than Switzerland.

North America

The Atchafalaya Swamp at the lower  end of the Mississippi River is the largest swamp in the United States. It is an important example of southern cypress swamp but it has been greatly altered by logging, drainage and levee construction. Other famous swamps in the United States are the forested portions of the Everglades, Okefenokee Swamp, Barley Barber Swamp, Great Cypress Swamp and the Great Dismal Swamp. The Okefenokee is located in extreme southeastern Georgia and extends slightly into northeastern Florida. The Great Cypress Swamp is mostly in Delaware but extends into Maryland on the Delmarva Peninsula. Point Lookout State Park on the southern tip of Maryland contains a large amount of swamps and marshes. The Great Dismal Swamp lies in extreme southeastern Virginia and extreme northeastern North Carolina. Both are National Wildlife Refuges. Another swamp area, Reelfoot Lake of extreme western Tennessee and Kentucky, was created by the 1811–12 New Madrid earthquakes. Caddo Lake, the Great Dismal and Reelfoot are swamps that are centered at large lakes. Swamps are often associated with bayous in the southeastern United States, especially in the Gulf Coast region. A baygall is a type of swamp found in the forest of the Gulf Coast states in the USA.

List of major swamps

The world's largest wetlands include significant areas of swamp, such as in the Amazon and Congo River basins.  Further north, however, the largest wetlands are bogs.

Africa
 Bangweulu Swamps, Zambia
 Mare aux Songes, Mauritius* 
 Niger Delta, Nigeria
 Okavango Swamp, Botswana
 Sudd, South Sudan

Asia
 Asmat Swamp, Indonesia
 Candaba Swamp in Apalit and Candaba, Pampanga and Pulilan, Bulacan, Philippines
 Mangrove Swamp in Karachi, Pakistan
 Myristica Swamp in Western Ghats, India
 Ratargul Swamp Forest in Sylhet, Bangladesh
 Sundarbans in India and Bangladesh
 Vasyugan Swamp, Russia
 Negombo Swamp, Sri Lanka

Australia 
Banksia Swamp, Victoria, Australia
Becher Point Wetlands, Western Australia
Burraga Swamp, New South Wales, Australia
 Coomonderry Swamp
Coastal Swamp Oak Forest, Queensland/New South Wales, Australia
Coastal Upland Swamps, New South Wales, Australia
Cumbung Swamp, New South Wales, Australia
Fivebough and Tuckerbil Swamps, New South Wales, Australia
Koo-Wee-Rup Swamp, Victoria, Australia
Noosa Everglades, Queensland, Australia
Toolibin Lake, Western Australia
West Melbourne Swamp, Victoria, Australia

Europe

 Pripyat Marshes, Belarus
 Šúr, Slovakia

North America
 Atchafalaya National Wildlife Refuge, Louisiana, United States
 Big Cypress National Preserve, Florida, United States
 Barley Barber Swamp, Florida, United States
 Cache River, Illinois, United States
 Caddo Lake, Texas/Louisiana, United States
 Cibuco Swamp, Puerto Rico
 Congaree Swamp, South Carolina, United States
 Everglades, Florida, United States
 First Landing State Park, Virginia, United States
 Grand Kankakee Marsh, Indiana, United States
 Great Black Swamp, Indiana/Ohio, United States
 Great Cypress Swamp, Delaware and Maryland, United States, also known as Great Pocomoke Swamp
 Great Dismal Swamp, North Carolina/Virginia, United States
 Great Swamp National Wildlife Refuge, New Jersey, United States
 Green Swamp, Florida, United States
 Green Swamp, North Carolina, United States
 Honey Island Swamp, Louisiana, United States
 Hudson Bay Lowlands, Ontario, Canada
 Limberlost, Indiana, United States
 Louisiana swamplands, Louisiana, United States
 Mingo National Wildlife Refuge, Puxico, Missouri, United States
 Okefenokee Swamp, Georgia/Florida, United States
 Pantanos de Centla, Tabasco/Campeche, Mexico
 Reelfoot Lake, Tennessee/Kentucky, United States
 Texas Swamplands, Texas, United States
 Tortuguero National Park, Limón, Costa Rica

 Washington, District of Columbia, United States

South America

 Caribbean Lowlands, Colombia
 Esteros del Iberá, Argentina
 Lahuen Ñadi, Chile
 Pantanal, Brazil, Bolivia and Paraguay
 Paraná Delta, Argentina

See also

References

External links

 
Flooded grasslands and savannas
Terrestrial ecoregions
Fluvial landforms
Pedology
Wetlands
Forest ecology
Bodies of water
Lacustrine landforms